The FACOM 100 was an early electromechanical computer built by Fujitsu in 1954 which used binary-coded decimal arithmetic.

The design of the later FACOM 128 was influenced by experience gained from building the FACOM 100.

References

See also 
 FACOM

Electro-mechanical computers
1950s computers